"Spicks and Specks" is a song by the Bee Gees, written by Barry Gibb. When the song was released in September 1966, the single reached No. 4 on the Go-Set Australian National Top 40 (No. 1 on other Australian charts), and when the song was released in other countries in February 1967, it reached No. 28 in Germany, No. 2 in the Netherlands and No. 1 in New Zealand.

Recording
"Spicks and Specks" is dated to early July by the memory of Geoff Grant (Geoffrey Streeter) who played the trumpet. Grant recalls working three nights in a row on four songs including this track, "I Am the World", "All by Myself", and "The Storm". There were no charts; Barry sang what he wanted live, and Grant copied it. Some of the artists whose disks came out in August recall hearing "Spicks and Specks" being worked on or completed, further confirming that early July is the approximate date of the song's recording. "Spicks and Specks" was a ballad around a strong piano beat.

Release
The single entered the Sydney charts at the end of September and stayed in the top 40 for 19 weeks, peaking at number 3. It appeared on the Go-Set National Top 40 for sixteen weeks, where it reached number 4 early in November.

Personnel
 Barry Gibb – lead and backing vocals
 Maurice Gibb – piano, bass, electric guitar
 Russell Barnsley – drums
 Geoff Grant – trumpet
 Steve Kipner – backing vocal
 Robin Gibb – backing vocal
 Nat Kipner – producer

Charts

References

Bee Gees songs
Songs written by Barry Gibb
1966 singles
1966 songs
1967 singles
Number-one singles in New Zealand
Status Quo (band) songs
The Searchers (band) songs
Polydor Records singles
Spin Records (Australian label) singles